Hintonia latiflora is a plant species in the genus Hintonia.

Hintonia latiflora contains the neoflavonoid coutareagenin (5-hydroxy-7-methoxy-4-(3,4-dihydroxyphenyl)-2H-benzo-1-pyran-2-ol), an antidiabetic active substance.

References

External links 

Catesbaeeae
Taxa named by Martín Sessé y Lacasta
Taxa named by José Mariano Mociño
Taxa named by Alphonse Pyramus de Candolle